This a list of complications that may result from the use of contact lenses.

Eyelid
 Ptosis

Conjunctiva
 Giant papillary conjunctivitis
 Superior limbic keratoconjunctivitis

Cornea
 Epithelium
 Corneal abrasion
 Corneal erosion
 Contact lens acute red eye (CLARE)
 Corneal epithelial infiltrates
 Keratitis
 Corneal ulcer
 Corneal stroma
 Corneal neovascularisation
  Corneal oedema
 Corneal infiltrates
  Corneal endothelium
 Endothelial polymegathism

See also
Effects of long-term contact lens wear on the cornea

Contact lenses